Hilal Al Atrash is a Syrian engineer and politician who served as minister of local administration and environment from 2001 to 2009.

Career
Atrash is an engineer by training. In November 2000, he was appointed governor of the Quneitra province, which was his first governorship. He was a member of the Baath party, being part of the reformist wing. He was appointed minister of local administration on 13 December 2000 to the cabinet headed by then prime minister Mohammed Mustafa Mero, which was reshuffled after Hafez Assad's death. Atrash's term ended in a cabinet reshuffle in April 2009 and he was succeeded by Tamer Al Hijeh. Then he was named Syrian ambassador to Libya.

References

Living people
Syrian engineers
Arab Socialist Ba'ath Party – Syria Region politicians
Syrian ministers of local administration
Ambassadors of Syria to Libya
Syrian Druze
Year of birth missing (living people)